Transport in Djibouti is overseen by the Ministry of Infrastructure & Transport. Over the last years, the Government of Djibouti have significantly increased funding for rail and road construction to build an infrastructure. They include highways, airports and seaports, in addition to various forms of public and private vehicular, maritime and aerial transportation.

Railways

The country's first railway, Ethio-Djibouti Railway, was a metre gauge railway that connected Ethiopia to Djibouti. It was built between 1894 and 1917 by the French who ruled the country at the time as French Somaliland. The railway is no longer operational.

Currently (2018), Djibouti has 93 km of railways. The new Addis Ababa-Djibouti Railway, an electrified standard gauge railway built by two Chinese government firms, began regular operations in January 2018. Its main purpose is to facilitate freight services between the Ethiopian hinterland and the Djiboutian Port of Doraleh. Railway services are provided by the Ethio-Djibouti Standard Gauge Rail Transport Share Company, a bi-national company between Ethiopia and Djibouti, which operates all commuter and freight railway services in the country. Djibouti has a total of four railway stations, of which three (Nagad, Holhol and Ali Sabieh) can handle passenger traffic.

Roads

The Djiboutian highway system is named according to the road classification. One routes in the Trans-African Highway network originate in Djibouti City. Djibouti also has multiple highway links with Ethiopia. Roads that are considered primary roads are those that are fully asphalted (throughout their entire length) and in general they connect all the major towns in Djibouti.

Ports and harbors

Djibouti has an improved natural harbor known as the Port of Djibouti. 95% of Ethiopia’s imports and exports move through Djiboutian ports. 

For decades, the Port of Djibouti was Djibouti's only freight port. It is now in the process of being replaced by the Port of Doraleh west of Djibouti City. In addition to the Port of Doraleh, which handles general cargo and oil imports, Djibouti currently (2018) has three other major ports for the import and export of bulk goods and livestock, the Port of Tadjourah (potash), the Damerjog Port (livestock) and the Port of Goubet (salt).

Merchant marine
as of 2003, A merchant fleet of 4 ships are registered under the Djibouti flag out of which 2 are general cargo

Airports

Djibouti has 13 airports, of which three have paved runways. Djibouti–Ambouli International Airport, just outside the city of Djibouti, is the country's international airport. There are also domestic airports at Tadjoura and Obock. Beginning in 1963, the state-owned Air Djibouti also provided domestic service to various domestic centers and flew to many overseas destinations. The national carrier discontinued operations in 2002. Daallo Airlines, a Somali-owned private carrier, has also offered air transportation since its foundation in 1991. With its hub at the Djibouti–Ambouli International Airport, the airline provides flights to a number of domestic and overseas destinations.

Airports – with paved runways
total:
3
over 3,047 m:
1
1,524 to 3,047 m:
2 (2013 est.)

Airports – with unpaved runways
total:
10
1,524 to 2,437 m:
1
914 to 1,523 m:
7
under 914 m:
2 (2013 est.)

References

Bibliography
Michelon 745 Africa North East, Arabia 2007
GeoCenter Africa North East 1999
Maplanida.com